William Morrissey (born circa 1889) was a rugby union player who represented Australia.

Morrissey, a prop, was born in Brisbane, Queensland and claimed 1 international rugby cap for Australia.

References

                   

Australian rugby union players
Australia international rugby union players
Year of birth uncertain
Rugby union players from Brisbane
Rugby union props